Anna is a municipality in Spain, located within Canal de Navarrés which is an administrative subdivision (called a comarca) in the Province of Valencia.  That province is in the middle of the autonomous Valencian Community of Spain.

Among this town's attractions is the Palacio de los Condes de Cervellón, which houses two museums: the Museo Etnológico de la Villa and the Museo del Agua.

References

Municipalities in the Province of Valencia
Canal de Navarrés